"From This Day" is a song by American heavy metal band Machine Head from the album The Burning Red. It was released as a single on October 31, 1999 and is also featured on the band's live album Hellalive.

The music video was directed by Michael Martin.

Track listing

Card sleeve promo
 "From This Day" (single version) – 3:07
 "From This Day" (album version) – 3:53
 "Call-Out Hook – 0:12

European edition
 "From This Day" (single version) – 3:07
 "Alcoholocaust" – 3:42
 "House of Suffering" (Bad Brains cover) – 2:09

Japanese edition
 "From This Day" – 3:55
 "Desire to Fire" (Live) – 4:39
 "The Blood, the Sweat, the Tears" (Live) – 4:35
 "From This Day" (Live) – 4:29

Promo white card sleeve
 "From This Day" (single version) – 3:07
 "From This Day" (album version) – 3:53
 "Call-Out Hook – 0:12

Charts

References

1999 singles
1999 songs
Machine Head (band) songs
Songs written by Robb Flynn
Nu metal songs
Rap rock songs
Roadrunner Records singles
Songs written by Dave McClain (drummer)
Songs written by Ahrue Luster